Aurantiacibacter odishensis is a bacterium from the genus Aurantiacibacter which has been isolated from dry soil.

References

Further reading

External links
Type strain of Erythrobacter odishensis at BacDive -  the Bacterial Diversity Metadatabase

Sphingomonadales
Bacteria described in 2013